The 1934 Pennsylvania gubernatorial election occurred on November 6, 1934. Incumbent Republican governor Gifford Pinchot was not a candidate for re-election. Democratic candidate George Howard Earle III defeated Republican candidate William A. Schnader to become Governor of Pennsylvania. This was the first Pennsylvania gubernatorial election won by the Democratic Party since 1890.

Election eve was marred by the Kelayres massacre, where the local small-town Republican boss and his family fired pistols, rifles and shotguns upon a Democratic rally and parade, killing three that night, and leaving at least a dozen more seriously wounded.  News of the attack was front-page headlines across the nation.  In Pennsylvania, the attack was strongly politicized in Democratic newspapers and on the radio.  There were numerous reports of Republicans voting Democratic due to the attack.  Schnader, as incumbent Attorney General, was forced to comment on the attack in strong terms, and to the end of his life, believed the attack cost him the election.

Republican primary

Candidates
Thomas Wharton Phillips Jr., former U.S. Representative from Butler County and candidate for Governor in 1926 and 1930
William A. Schnader, Pennsylvania Attorney General
Edward C. Shannon, Lieutenant Governor of Pennsylvania
Edward L. Stokes, U.S. Representative from Philadelphia
George Austin Welsh, U.S. District Court judge and former U.S. Representative from Philadelphia

Democratic primary

Candidates
George Howard Earle III, U.S. Minister to Austria
John A. McSparran, Pennsylvania Secretary of Agriculture and nominee for Governor in 1922
William N. McNair, Mayor of Pittsburgh

General election

Candidates
Herbert T. Ames, former mayor of Williamsport (Prohibition)
Emmett Patrick Cush (Communist)
Bess Gyekis (Industrial Labor)
George Howard Earle III, U.S. Minister to Austria (Democratic)
Jesse H. Holmes (Socialist)
William A. Schnader, Pennsylvania Attorney General (Republican)

Results

References

1934
Pennsylvania
Gubernatorial
November 1934 events